Brad Stine (born January 21, 1960) is an American actor, author, and comedian. Relatively unknown until 2003, Stine first gained exposure when he was identified as a conservative Christian on his debut album, Put a Helmet On!

Biography

Early life
Stine was born and raised in Bremen, Indiana by Jerry and Nancy Stine. His father was an auto-body repairman and front man for a local musical combo called the Regents, and his mother was a housewife. He is the second of four children.

Stine's parents divorced when he was eight, but they later remarried and moved to California, only to divorce again. He stayed with his father, who briefly left the auto-body business to travel with his brother to carnivals in the Midwest. His father later remarried and returned to his previous work.

Early career
Stine started practicing magic tricks at age 13, which later led to his performing magic in Southern California bars and restaurants. Stine also learned to perform sideshow stunts and began honing his comedy skills.

In the late 1980s, Stine was hired by a manager and toured colleges across the country with comedians Craig Anton and Emery Emery. His first television appearance was on Showtime’s Comedy Club Network.

Stine continued to work in comedy clubs and on TV, and eventually dropped his magic tricks and stunts. He started taking acting lessons and auditioned for movies and television shows. On the advice of a fellow comic, he eventually made his Christian faith and conservatism the focus of his act.

Personal life
He resides in Brentwood, Tennessee, with his wife Desiree, and their two children.

Comedic style
Stine's style has been described by Newsweek as "conservative " with a "rat-a-tat delivery" and by The New Yorker as "frantic," "conservative," and "ADHD," with echoes of Robin Williams, Sam Kinison, Bill Hicks, George Carlin." However, unlike these and a lot of other comedians, Stine does not use profanity or sexual humor because of his conservative Christian faith.He has been described as "a clean Denis Leary" and his material targets "liberals, humanists, political correctness and judgmental Christians." Stine has claimed that his conservatism has sometimes resulted in the loss of appearances. Stine himself admits that much of his more extreme material is facetious and satirical, using ridiculous scenarios to make a finer point.

Major appearances
Stine has appeared on several stand-up comedy shows, such as A&E’s Evening at the Improv and MTV's Half Hour Comedy Hour, and has appeared on news programs such as Fox News' Hannity & Colmes, CNN's Paula Zahn NOW and Glenn Beck, and the NBC Nightly News. Stine has also been interviewed on National Public Radio and has been featured on FOXNews.com and in Newsweek, the New Yorker, USA Today, and several other newspapers nationwide. He was a featured performer for Promise Keepers in 2003, 2004, 2005, 2007 and once again in 2012 and also in 2014
. Also in 2004, he performed for "R: the Party," a party hosted by Jenna and Barbara Bush during the conservative Republican National Convention in New York City. Stine has also appeared with Go Fish for the song Christmas with a Capital "C", which disparages the inclusive term "happy holidays" and supports the use of the term "Merry Christmas."

GodMen
Inspired by author David Murrow, Stine founded GodMen, a proposed alternative to Promise Keepers that emphasizes "spiritual conservatism". GodMen's inaugural event was held on October 28, 2006, in Nashville, Tennessee, and drew 200 men. Their second event was held on March 10, 2007, in rented space at a Franklin, Tennessee, mall and drew about 300 men. Many more events were scheduled for 2007 and 2008. As of spring 2012, Stine has returned to Promise Keepers.

Acting work
Stine has appeared in minor roles in a handful of big and small screen movies, including the films Welcome to Paradise, Sarah's Choice, Homeless for the Holidays, Christmas with a Capital C and Persecuted.

Multimedia
Stine currently has two books and five performance videos/recordings available. In September 2008, he was featured in the multi-comedian DVD The Apostles of Comedy, which also features comedian/actors Ron Pearson, Jeff Allen and Anthony Griffith. The four comedians have been touring the country as The Apostles of Comedy since 2008 and are scheduled through May 2009.

Books

Videos/recordings

References

External links
 Brad Stine's official website
 God's Comic (Stine's blog)
 
 GodMen website
 Brad mentioned in The History of Christian Stand-up Comedy
 

1960 births
American Christians
American stand-up comedians
Living people
Male actors from Los Angeles
Male actors from Nashville, Tennessee
People from Marshall County, Indiana
Promise Keepers
Comedians from California
20th-century American comedians
21st-century American comedians